Loïc Chatton (born 26 February 1991) is a Swiss professional footballer who plays as a forward for Breitenrain.

Career
Chatton made his professional debut with FC Biel-Bienne's first team in October 2008 against FC Winterthur in the Swiss Challenge League with a 2–0 victory. His first game with the Switzerland U-19 national team was on 21 April 2010 against Italy.

On 31 October 2010, Chatton signed a five-year professional contract with FC Sion in the Swiss Super League. The club won the Swiss Cup on 29 May 2011 (2–0 against Neuchâtel Xamax). Although he played in all of the cup matches leading up to the final, he did not enter into the game on this 12th cup victory of the club.

In July 2013, Chatton decided to join Neuchâtel Xamax FCS in the Swiss 1. Liga, the Swiss fourth tier, with some others national league players and helped the club to return to the Swiss Challenge League in 2015 with two successive championships and promotions. In August 2015, he was operated after a knee injury (meniscus and cartilage) contracted after the first season game and made his comeback on the field on 16 April 2016 against FC Chiasso, after nine months without playing. With one goal in the last five games he took part to the surprising second place of his team in the CHL.

Honours
Sion
 Swiss Cup: 2011

External links

Player interview at rts.ch

1991 births
People from Biel/Bienne
Sportspeople from the canton of Bern
Living people
Swiss men's footballers
Switzerland youth international footballers
Association football forwards
FC Biel-Bienne players
FC Sion players
FC Lugano players
Neuchâtel Xamax FCS players
FC Solothurn players
Breitenrain Bern players
Swiss Challenge League players
Swiss 1. Liga (football) players
Swiss Super League players
Swiss Promotion League players